Thomas Welsh (frequently known as T.A. Welsh) was a British film producer. Along with George Pearson he was one of the co-owners of Welsh-Pearson, a leading British company of the late silent era. The company made many popular hits at its Craven Park Studios during the 1920s.

Selected filmography
 Squibs' Honeymoon (1923)
 East Lynne on the Western Front (1931)

References

Bibliography
 Low, Rachael. The History of the British Film, 1918-1929. George Allen & Unwin, 1971.
 Warren, Patricia. British Film Studios: An Illustrated History. Batsford, 2001.

External links

British film producers
Year of birth unknown
Year of death unknown